The following outline is provided as an overview of and topical guide to second-language acquisition:

Second-language acquisition –  process by which people learn a second language. Second-language acquisition (often abbreviated to SLA) also refers to the scientific discipline devoted to studying that process. Second language refers to any language learned in addition to a person's first language, including the learning of third, fourth, and subsequent languages. It is also called second-language learning, foreign language acquisition, and L2 acquisition.

What is second-language acquisition? 

Second-language acquisition can be described as all of the following:

 Language acquisition – process by which humans acquire the capacity to perceive and comprehend language, as well as to produce and use words and sentences to communicate. Language acquisition is one of the quintessential human traits, because nonhumans do not communicate by using language.
 Academic discipline – branch of knowledge that is taught or researched at the college or university level. Also called a field of study. Disciplines are defined (in part) and recognized by the academic journals in which research is published, and the learned societies and academic departments or faculties to which their practitioners belong. A discipline incorporates relevant knowledge, expertise, skills, people, projects, communities, problems, challenges, studies, inquiry, approaches, and research areas.
 Branch of science – systematic enterprise that builds and organizes knowledge in the form of testable explanations and predictions about the universe. "Science" also refers to a body of knowledge itself, of the type that can be rationally explained and reliably applied.
 Branch of social science – academic discipline concerned with the society and the relationships of individuals within a society, which primarily rely on empirical approaches.
 Branch of linguistics – scientific study of human language.
 Branch of applied linguistics – interdisciplinary field of study that identifies, investigates, and offers solutions to language-related real-life problems. Some of the academic fields related to applied linguistics are education, linguistics, psychology, computer science, anthropology, and sociology.
 A form of language education – teaching and learning of a foreign or second language. Language education is a branch of applied linguistics.

Branches of second-language acquisition 

 English as a second or foreign language – use or study of English by speakers with different native languages. It is also known as English for speakers of other languages (ESOL), English as an additional language (EAL), and English as a foreign language (EFL).
 Chinese as a foreign language – study of the varieties of Chinese by non-native speakers.
 Spanish as a second language – teaching and learning of Spanish for those whose mother tongue is not Spanish, particularly immigrants, tourists, indigenous peoples and refugees.
 Etc.

Related fields 
 Teaching English as a foreign language –

Learning objectives: language skills 

 Foreign-language vocabulary –
 Linguistic competence –
 Linguistic performance –
 Language fluency –
 Language proficiency –
 Multilingualism –
 Bilingualism –

Second-language acquisition resources

Second-language acquisition methods and activities 
 Extensive listening – similar to extensive reading, it's the analogous approach to listening. One issue is that listening speed is generally slower than reading speed, so simpler texts are recommended.
 Extensive reading – large amount of reading, to increase unknown word encounters and associated learning opportunities by inferencing. The learner's view and review of unknown words in specific context will allow the learner to infer and thus learn those words' meanings.
 Intensive reading – slow, careful reading of a small amount of difficult text – it is when one is "focused on the language rather than the text".
 Language immersion – teaching and self-teaching method in which the second language is the medium of instruction, with no use of primary language allowed. All educational materials and all communication are in the second language.
 Paderborn method – learn a simple language first, such as Esperanto, and then the target second language. Saves time by making the second language easier to learn.
 Vocabulary acquisition –

Second-language acquisition tools 
 Dictionary – collection of words in one or more specific languages, often listed alphabetically, with usage information, definitions, etymologies, phonetics, pronunciations, and other relevant information.
 Mono-lingual dictionary – dictionary in a single language. A mono-lingual dictionary in the language being acquired assists the reader in describing words (and thinking about the language) in the language's own terms.
 Bilingual dictionary – also called a translation dictionary, is a specialized dictionary used to translate words or phrases from one language to another.
 Unidirectional bilingual dictionary – lists the meanings of words of one language in another
 Bidirectional bilingual dictionary – presents translation to and from both included languages.
 Talking dictionary – some online dictionaries and dictionary programs provide text-to-speech pronunciation.
 Visual dictionary – dictionary that primarily uses pictures to illustrate the meaning of words. Each component within each picture is labeled with its name. Visual dictionaries can be monolingual or multilingual. Visual dictionaries in the language being acquired are especially useful in language immersion approaches.
 Media in the target language
 Books
 Audio books
 Encyclopedias
 Wikipedia (see language editions list)
 Music
 Lyrics (to read along) (see ColorSounds)
 Videos
 Movies
 TV shows
 Websites
 Subtitles –
 Closed captioning –
 Word lists by frequency – lists of a language's words grouped by frequency of occurrence within some given text corpus, either by levels or as a ranked list, serving the purpose of vocabulary acquisition.

History of second-language acquisition 

History of second-language acquisition

Second-language acquisition phenomena 
 Second-language attrition – decline of second-language skills due to lack of use or practice of the second language and/or lack of exposure to it.
 Code-switching – switching between two or more languages, or language varieties, in the context of a single conversation.
 Communication strategies in second-language acquisition
 Interlanguage –
 Second-language phonology –
 Silent period – stage in second language acquisition where learners do not attempt to speak. Silent periods are more common in children than in adult learners, as there is often more pressure on adult learners to speak during the early stages of acquisition.

Factors affecting the learning of a second-language 
 Individual variation in second-language acquisition –
 Foreign language anxiety
 Language-learning aptitude – aptitude measurement via tests, the results of which correlate with how well the test takers will succeed at picking up a new language. Language aptitude test include:
 Modern Language Aptitude Test – mainly authored by John B. Carroll, for adults, mainly used by government and military institutions to select employees for language training
 Defense Language Aptitude Battery – developed and used by the United States Department of Defense to select candidates for jobs that will require them to attain fluency in a foreign language
 Pimsleur Language Aptitude Battery – authored by Paul Pimsleur, used to assess the language learning aptitude of students in grades 7 to 12
 Modern Language Aptitude Test – Elementary – mainly authored by John B. Carroll, designed to test children in grades 3 to 6
 Cognitive Ability for Novelty in Acquisition of Language - Foreign – developed by Grigorenko, Sternberg, and Ehrman in 2000, using a new concept of language aptitude as a theoretical base
 Motivation in second-language learning –
 Willingness to communicate – students willing to communicate in the second language learn how, those who are not willing, not so much.
 Metalinguistic awareness –

Hypothesized success factors 

 Acculturation model – hypothesis in which effectiveness in acquiring a second language is due in part to how well the learner acclimatizes to the culture (and members) of the target language. Increases in the social and psychological distances the learner has from the members of the target culture leads to fewer opportunities to learn the language.
 Input hypothesis –
 Interaction hypothesis – the development of language proficiency is promoted by face-to-face interaction and communication.
 Comprehensible output hypothesis –
 Competition model – posits that the meaning of language is interpreted by comparing a number of linguistic cues within a sentence, and that language is learned through the competition of basic cognitive mechanisms in the presence of a rich linguistic environment.
 Noticing hypothesis – concept proposed by Richard Schmidt, which states that learners cannot learn the grammatical features of a language unless they notice them. That is, noticing is the essential starting point for acquisition. Whether the noticing can be subconscious is a matter of debate.

Second-language acquisition research 
 Good language learner studies
 Second-language acquisition classroom research

Second-language acquisition-related organizations 
Eataw
 European Second Language Association
 National Association of Bilingual Education –
 National Clearinghouse for English Language Acquisition (NCELA) –
 Language camps – summer camps hosted by high schools, colleges, and universities; high schools, colleges, and universities around the United States have developed programs such as summer programs, to meet the growing demand for language education. Many of these summer programs are language camps.

Second-language acquisition publications 

Applied Linguistics (journal)
Journal of Second Language Writing
Language Learning (journal)
Language Teaching Research
Second Language Research
System
TESOL Journal
TESOL Quarterly

Persons influential in second-language acquisition 
 Alexander Arguelles – 
 Ellen Bialystok – 
 John Bissell Carroll – 
 Kees de Bot - bilingualism
 H. Douglas Brown – 
 Pit Corder – 
 Marijn van Dijk - child language acquisition
 Nick Ellis – 
 Rod Ellis – 
 Susan M. Ervin-Tripp – 
 Paul van Geert - developmental psychology
 Fred Genesee – 
 David W. Green – 
 François Grosjean – 
 Luke Harding - Language testing
 Judit Kormos - Motivation in second language learning
 Stephen Krashen – 
 Judith F. Kroll – 
 Diane Larsen-Freeman - Complex Dynamic Systems Theory
 Ping Li – 
 Michael Long – 
 Wander Lowie - Complex Dynamic Systems Theory
 Brian MacWhinney – Competition model
 Viorica Marian – 
 Paul Kei Matsuda – Second language writing
 Stephen Matthews (linguist) – 
 Jurgen M. Meisel – 
 Carol Myers-Scotton 
 Paul Nation – Second language vocabulary
 Teresa Pica
 Paul Pimsleur - 
 Wilga Rivers –
 Richard Schmidt –
 Norbert Schmitt - Second language vocabulary
 Carmen Silva-Corvalan – 
 Dan Slobin – 
 Merrill Swain – 
 Tracy D. Terrell – 
 Michael T. Ullman – 
 Jyotsna Vaid
 Bill Van Patten –
 Marjolijn Verspoor - Complex Dynamic Systems Theory
 Lydia White –
 Virginia Yip –

See also 
 Outline of education
 Generative principle
Suggestopedia

References

External links 

Didactics of English. A lecture series in SLA by Timothy Mason, run from 1993 to 2002 at the Université of Versailles St. Quentin.
Second Language Acquisition Topics by Vivian Cook: information on SLA, applied linguistics and language teaching research, including a large bibliography.
 Bilingualism FAQ, National Literacy Trust – questions and answers for parents of young children.

Outline
Second-language acquisition
Second-language acquisition